Eamon Bulfin (1892–1968) was an Argentine-born Irish republican. He was the son of writer William Bulfin (1864–1910)  of Birr, in County Offaly (then called King's County). His father had emigrated to Argentina at the age of 20 and was a writer and journalist who became the editor/proprietor of The Southern Cross.

Early life and family 
Eamon's mother, Annie O'Rourke, employed as a governess on the same estancia, crossed paths with William Bulfin. As a fellow Westmeath native, they found common ground and their relationship withstood distance when he left the gaucho lifestyle in the late 1880s to work at The Southern Cross in Buenos Aires. They tied the knot in approximately 1890, established roots in Buenos Aires, giving birth to Eamon in 1892. Subsequently, they had four daughters named Catalina , Mary, Aileen, and Anita. Bulfin was a pupil at Patrick Pearse's school, Sgoil Éanna (in English, St Enda's), and studied at University College Dublin, where he became captain of the Irish Volunteer Company. One of Pearse's favourite pupils, he assisted with teaching after he graduated. He was recruited to the Irish Republican Brotherhood in 1913, and along with some fellow St Enda's students created home-made bombs in the school's basement in preparation for the Easter Rising.

In the Easter Rising of 1916, he raised the green flag  Upon the arrival of the flags, James Connolly requested that Bulfin raise them on the flag poles situated at each end of the roof. The tricolour was then hoisted on the right corner of Henry Street, while a green flag displaying the words 'Irish Republic' was raised on the left corner at Princess Street. Following the rising he was condemned to death, but was reprieved and deported to Buenos Aires after internment in Frongoch internment camp in Wales along with the other Irish soldiers of the Rising.

His sister Catalina (1901–1976) was secretary to Austin Stack. Catalina Bulfin married the Nobel Prize winner Seán MacBride, a founding member of Amnesty International, the son of Major John MacBride and Maud Gonne.

Bulfin married Nora Brick in 1927, with whom he had four children, including the sculptor Michael Bulfin.

Career 
Éamon de Valera made Bulfin Irish Representative to Argentina. De Valera described Bulfin's job as to "inaugurate direct trade between Ireland and the Argentine Republic… to co-ordinate Irish opinion in the Argentine, and to bring it into the Irish demand for a republic." While carrying out these duties, Bulfin maintained a close line of communication with Michael Collins in Ireland.

Bulfin was one of several representatives abroad appointed for that purpose during the War of Independence, and recognition of the importance of their work led to the establishment in February 1921 of a Department of Foreign Affairs.

In the 1920 County Council elections, Bulfin was nominated in his absence for a seat on the council of Offaly, his family's county of origin. He was elected and though he was in Argentina, immediately appointed chairman of the council. One of the first actions of the new council was to agree that King's County be renamed Offaly, the name of the ancient Gaelic kingdom from which part of the modern county was formed.

In 1924, Bulfin joined the staff of The Southern Cross, becoming its London editor in 1933. From this post he wrote extensively on world politics and current affairs from a pro-Irish point of view. His columns focused on the causes of Irish independence and autonomy and even offered advice to other countries seeking self-determination. In addition to his political writings, he also published short stories and poetry in both English and Spanish. 

On the formation of the Irish Free State, Bulfin returned to Ireland, and became active in local politics.

Later life, death and legacy 
Bulfin remained at The Southern Cross until 1940 when he returned to Ireland due to ill health. During his time there, he made many contacts within the Argentinean literary community that would later influence his work back home. After returning to Ireland he continued writing for several publications including The Irish Press and Interim Magazine before retiring in 1954. During his later years, Bulfin was hesitant to discuss his involvement in revolutionary activities. However, he participated in public events in Offaly commemorating the fiftieth anniversary of the Easter rising. Afterward, he retired from farming and relocated to 6 Smith's Cottages in Donnybrook, Dublin. Bulfin died on Christmas Eve 1968, and is buried in Eglish churchyard near Birr, Co Offaly. Bulfin Road in Inchicore, Dublin 8 is named after him.

See also
Francis Bulfin

References

External links
An Irish Argentine in the Easter Rising (The Irish Post)
Murray, Edmundo. Bulfin, Eamon (1892-1968), Irish republican and diplomatist in "Irish Migration Studies in Latin America", November–December 2005

Politicians from County Offaly
People from Buenos Aires
Early Sinn Féin politicians
Irish diplomats
Argentine people of Irish descent
1892 births
1968 deaths
Place of birth missing
People educated at St. Enda's School
Argentine emigrants to the United Kingdom